Eddie Faulkner (born October 20, 1977) is an American football coach who is currently the running backs coach for the Pittsburgh Steelers of the National Football League (NFL).

Playing career 
Faulkner played college football at Wisconsin from 1996 to 2000. He was a tailback, compiling 1,064 yards and seven touchdowns over his career. After his college career was over, he signed a pro contract with the Pittsburgh Steelers before going on to play for the Edmonton Eskimos.

Coaching career 
After his playing career was over, he started coaching at Anderson University as a running backs coach before moving on to Ball State.

Ball State 
Faulkner joined the coaching staff at Ball State as a graduate assistant in 2003, working all the way up to offensive coordinator in 2009. He was named the interim head coach in 2010 after Stan Parrish was fired.

Northern Illinois 
Faulkner left Northern Illinois to accept an assistant coaching position at Pittsburgh before leaving Pittsburgh to take a position at his alma mater Wisconsin.

Wisconsin 
Faulkner was named the tight ends coach at his alma mater Wisconsin in 2012.

NC State 
Faulkner left Wisconsin after one season to accept a position at NC State as a tight ends and fullbacks coach, and special teams coordinator.

Pittsburgh Steelers 
Faulkner was named the running backs coach for the Pittsburgh Steelers on January 17, 2019.

References

External links 
 Pittsburgh Steelers bio
 NC State Wolfpack bio
 Ball State Cardinals bio

1977 births
Living people
Sportspeople from Muncie, Indiana
Players of American football from Indiana
American football running backs
Wisconsin Badgers football players
University of Wisconsin–Madison alumni
Pittsburgh Steelers players
Edmonton Elks players
Anderson Ravens football coaches
Ball State Cardinals football coaches
Ball State University alumni
Northern Illinois Huskies football coaches
Pittsburgh Panthers football coaches
Wisconsin Badgers football coaches
NC State Wolfpack football coaches
Pittsburgh Steelers coaches